Hugo Valvanne was a Finnish diplomat. He was the first envoy of Finland to India, and took up his post shortly after diplomatic relations between the two countries were established on 1 October 1949.

References 

Translators to Finnish
Ambassadors of Finland to India
Ambassadors of Finland to Switzerland
Year of birth missing
Year of death missing
20th-century translators